Dowlatabad (also Romanized as Dowlatābād) is a village in Esmaili Rural District, Esmaili District, Anbarabad County, Kerman Province, Iran. At the 2006 census, its population was 383, in 94 families.

References 

Populated places in Anbarabad County